Cook High School is a public high school located in Cook County, Georgia, United States, with an Adel postal address. The school is part of the Cook County School District, which serves Cook County.

Athletics 
Cook High competes in GHSA Region 1-AA as of the 2021–2022 school year.  The school offers the following sports:
 
 Baseball
 Basketball (boys' and girls')
 Cheerleading
 Football
 Soccer (boys' and girls')
 Softball
 Tennis (boys’ and girls’)
 Track (boys’ and girls’)
 Wrestling
 Golf

Notable alumni
 Kaleb Cowart – MLB player, Los Angeles Angels of Anaheim
 Kenny Tippins – former NFL player

References

External links
 Cook County School District
 Cook High School

Schools in Cook County, Georgia
Public high schools in Georgia (U.S. state)